Sol Rutchick (April 27, 1899 – October 18, 1965) was an American Thoroughbred racehorse trainer. He was the trainer of the winning horse Count Turf in the 1951 Kentucky Derby.

A native of Russia, at age 12 Rutchick emigrated to the United States.

References

1899 births
1965 deaths
American horse trainers
Emigrants from the Russian Empire to the United States